In graph theory, a branch of mathematics, a split graph is a graph in which the vertices can be partitioned into a clique and an independent set.

A split graph may have more than one partition into a clique and an independent set; for instance, the path  is a split graph, the vertices of which can be partitioned in three different ways:
the clique  and the independent set 
the clique  and the independent set 
the clique  and the independent set 

Split graphs can be characterized in terms of their forbidden induced subgraphs: a graph is split if and only if no induced subgraph is a cycle on four or five vertices, or a pair of disjoint edges (the complement of a 4-cycle).

Relation to other graph families
From the definition, split graphs are clearly closed under complementation. Another characterization of split graphs involves complementation: they are chordal graphs the complements of which are also chordal. Just as chordal graphs are the intersection graphs of subtrees of trees, split graphs are the intersection graphs of distinct substars of star graphs. Almost all chordal graphs are split graphs; that is, in the limit as n goes to infinity, the fraction of n-vertex chordal graphs that are split approaches one.

Because chordal graphs are perfect, so are the split graphs.

If a graph is both a split graph and an interval graph, then its complement is both a split graph and a comparability graph, and vice versa. The split comparability graphs, and therefore also the split interval graphs, can be characterized in terms of a set of three forbidden induced subgraphs. The split cographs are exactly the threshold graphs. The split permutation graphs are exactly the interval graphs that have interval graph complements;
these are the permutation graphs of skew-merged permutations. Split graphs have cochromatic number 2.

Algorithmic problems
Let  be a split graph, partitioned into a clique  and an independent set . Thus, it is easy to identify the maximum clique, and complementarily the maximum independent set in a split graph. In any split graph, one of the following three possibilities must be true:
 There exists a vertex  in  such that  is complete.
 There exists a vertex  in  such that  is independent.

Some other optimization problems that are NP-complete on more general graph families, including graph coloring, are similarly straightforward on split graphs. Finding a Hamiltonian cycle remains NP-complete even for split graphs which are strongly chordal graphs. It is also well known that the Minimum Dominating Set problem remains NP-complete for split graphs.

Degree sequences
One remarkable property of split graphs is that they can be recognized solely from their degree sequences. Let the degree sequence of a graph  be , and let  be the largest value of  such that . Then  is a split graph if and only if

The splittance of an arbitrary graph measures the extent to which this inequality fails to be true. If a graph is not a split graph, then the smallest sequence of edge insertions and removals that make it into a split graph can be obtained by adding all missing edges between the  vertices with the largest degrees, and removing all edges between pairs of the remaining vertices; the splittance counts the number of operations in this sequence.

Counting split graphs
 showed that n-vertex split graphs with n are in one-to-one correspondence with certain Sperner families. Using this fact, he  determined a formula for the number of nonisomorphic split graphs on n vertices. For small values of n, starting from n = 1, these numbers are
1, 2, 4, 9, 21, 56, 164, 557, 2223, 10766, 64956, 501696, ... .

Notes

References

.
.
.
.
.
.
.
.
.
.
.
.
.

.
. Translated as "Yet another method of enumerating unmarked combinatorial objects" (1990), Mathematical notes of the Academy of Sciences of the USSR 48 (6): 1239–1245, .
.
.

Further reading
A chapter on split graphs appears in the book by Martin Charles Golumbic, "Algorithmic Graph Theory and Perfect Graphs".

Graph families
Intersection classes of graphs
Perfect graphs